The Invisible Man is a 1984 Soviet science fiction film directed by Aleksandr Zakharov based on the 1897 eponymous novel by H. G. Wells.

Plot
Dr. Griffin, with no other motive than curiosity, undertakes research on the concept of invisibility. Having become invisible, he finds himself in an unfortunate combination of circumstances consisting of being suspected of murder and hunted down, forced to abandon the notebooks containing the notes of his experiences that would enable him to carry out the opposite process. His former classmate Dr. Kemp promises to find them, but in fact intends to use them himself in search of absolute power.

Cast
 Andrey Kharitonov as  Jonathan Griffin, The Invisible Man
 Romualdas Ramanauskas (voiced by Sergei Malishevsky) as Kemp
 Leonid Kuravlyov as Thomas Marvel
 Natalia Danilova as Jane Bet
 Oleg Golubitsky as Colonel Edai, Chief of Police 
 Nina Agapova as Mrs. Hall
 Viktor Sergachyov	as	Mr. Hall
 Alexander Pyatkov	as	Bar owner

References

External links
 

1980s science fiction films
Mosfilm films
Soviet science fiction films
Films scored by Eduard Artemyev
Films based on The Invisible Man